Brooke Eden Helvie (born December 30, 1988), known professionally as Brooke Eden, is an American country music singer and songwriter. Eden auditioned for both the seventh and tenth seasons of American Idol, making it to Hollywood week on the former. She signed with Red Bow Records in 2015 after generating interest for her self-released single "American Dreamin'".

Biography

Early years
Eden developed an interest in music at a young age through accompanying her father to performances of his as a drummer in a local country group. In her teens, she played local music festivals and opened for such acts as Alan Jackson and Brooks & Dunn. Eden graduated from Wellington High School in 2007. She attended high school with and befriended fellow musician Cassadee Pope. In 2008, Eden won the title of "Miss South Florida" at a regional beauty pageant and auditioned for season seven of the singing competition television show, American Idol. She made it through to the Hollywood week, but was eliminated from the competition before the live rounds. Eden auditioned again for the show's tenth season but failed to advance. After graduating from the University of Florida, Eden moved to Nashville, Tennessee and in 2013, she signed a publishing deal with BMI.

2014–present: Brooke Eden and Welcome to the Weekend
In March 2014, Eden independently released a five-song self-titled extended play. A single, titled "American Dreamin'", followed that July, which generated interest at satellite radio but failed to impact the charts. Eden signed to independent record label Red Bow Records (a sister label of Broken Bow Records) in 2015. Her single "Daddy's Money" was released in December 2015 and reached number 50 on the Billboard Country Airplay chart. She released her second EP, Welcome to the Weekend, and its lead single, "Diamonds", in September 2016. "Act Like You Don't" was released to American country radio on February 13, 2017 as the record's second single.

On June 29, 2019 she opened for Garth Brooks' "stadium tour" in front of 60,000 fans at Autzen stadium in Eugene Oregon.

In 2021, she released new songs "No Shade" and "Sunroof".

Personal life
In January 2021, Eden publicly came out as queer.

In December 2015, she began dating Hilary Hoover, a radio promoter. On May 25, 2021, they announced their engagement. On August 27, 2022, they were married in Nashville, Tennessee, officiated by Trisha Yearwood.

Discography

Extended plays

Singles

Other appearances

References

External links

American women country singers
Living people
1988 births
21st-century American singers
21st-century American women singers
Country musicians from Florida
American LGBT singers
LGBT people from Florida
21st-century LGBT people